Lewis's trilemma is an apologetic argument traditionally used to argue for the divinity of Jesus by postulating that the only alternatives were that he was evil or mad. One version was popularised by University of Oxford literary scholar and writer C. S. Lewis in a BBC radio talk and in his writings. It is sometimes described as the "Lunatic, Liar, or Lord", or "Mad, Bad, or God" argument. It takes the form of a trilemma — a choice among three options, each of which is in some way difficult to accept.

This argument is very popular with Christian apologists, but some theologians and biblical scholars do not believe that Jesus claimed to be God.

History
This argument has been used in various forms throughout church history. It was used by the American preacher Mark Hopkins in his book Lectures on the Evidences of Christianity (1846), based on lectures delivered in 1844. Another early use of this approach was by the Scots preacher "Rabbi" John Duncan (1796–1870), around 1859–60:

Christ either deceived mankind by conscious fraud, or He was Himself deluded and self-deceived, or He was Divine. There is no getting out of this trilemma. It is inexorable.

Others who used this approach included N. P. Williams, Reuben Archer Torrey (1856–1928) and W. E. Biederwolf (1867–1939). The writer G.K. Chesterton used something similar to the trilemma in his book, The Everlasting Man (1925), which Lewis cited in 1962 as the second book that most influenced him.

Lewis's formulation
C. S. Lewis was an Oxford medieval literature scholar, popular writer, Christian apologist, and former atheist. He used the argument outlined below in a series of BBC radio talks later published as the book Mere Christianity.

I am trying here to prevent anyone saying the really foolish thing that people often say about Him: I'm ready to accept Jesus as a great moral teacher, but I don't accept his claim to be God.  That is the one thing we must not say.  A man who was merely a man and said the sort of things Jesus said would not be a great moral teacher.  He would either be a lunatic — on the level with the man who says he is a poached egg — or else he would be the Devil of Hell. You must make your choice.  Either this man was, and is, the Son of God, or else a madman or something worse. You can shut him up for a fool, you can spit at him and kill him as a demon or you can fall at his feet and call him Lord and God, but let us not come with any patronizing nonsense about his being a great human teacher. He has not left that open to us. He did not intend to. ... Now it seems to me obvious that He was neither a lunatic nor a fiend: and consequently, however strange or terrifying or unlikely it may seem, I have to accept the view that He was and is God.

Lewis, who had spoken extensively on Christianity to Royal Air Force personnel, was aware many ordinary people did not believe Jesus was God, but saw him rather as "a 'great human teacher' who was deified by his supporters"; his argument is intended to overcome this. It is based on a traditional assumption that, in his words and deeds, Jesus was asserting a claim to be God. For example, in Mere Christianity, Lewis refers to what he says are Jesus's claims:

to have authority to forgive sins — behaving as if he really was "the person chiefly offended in all offences."
to have always existed, and
to intend to come back to judge the world at the end of time.

Lewis implies that these amount to a claim to be God and argues that they logically exclude the possibility that Jesus was merely "a great moral teacher", because he believes no ordinary human making such claims could possibly be rationally or morally reliable. Elsewhere, he refers to this argument as "the aut Deus aut malus homo" ("either God or a bad man"), a reference to an earlier version of the argument used by Henry Parry Liddon in his 1866 Bampton Lectures, in which Liddon argued for the divinity of Jesus based on a number of grounds, including the claims he believed Jesus made.

In Narnia 
A version of this argument appears in Lewis' book The Lion, the Witch and the Wardrobe. When Lucy and Edmund return from Narnia (her second visit and his first), Edmund tells Peter and Susan that he was playing along with Lucy and pretending they went to Narnia. Peter and Susan believe Edmund and are worried that Lucy might be mentally ill, so they seek out the Professor whose house they are living in. After listening to them explain the situation and asking them some questions, he responds:

Influence

Christian
The trilemma has continued to be used in Christian apologetics since Lewis, notably by writers like Josh McDowell. Peter Kreeft describes the trilemma as "the most important argument in Christian apologetics" and it forms a major part of the first talk in the Alpha Course and the book based on it, Questions of Life by Nicky Gumbel. Ronald Reagan also used this argument in 1978, in a written reply to a liberal Methodist minister who said that he did not believe Jesus was the son of God. A variant has also been quoted by Bono. The Lewis version was cited by Charles Colson as the basis of his conversion to Christianity. Stephen Davis, a supporter of Lewis and of this argument, argues that it can show belief in the Incarnation as rational. Bruce M. Metzger argued that "It has often been pointed out that Jesus' claim to be the only Son of God is either true or false. If it is false, he either knew the claim was false or he did not know that it was false. In the former case (2) he was a liar; in the latter case (3) he was a lunatic. No other conclusion beside these three is possible." It has also been put forward by Catholic apologist Robert Barron.

Non-Christian
The atheist writer Christopher Hitchens accepts Lewis's analysis of the options but reaches the opposite conclusion: that Jesus was not good. He writes, "I am bound to say that Lewis is more honest here. Absent a direct line to the Almighty and a conviction that the last days are upon us, how is it 'moral' ... to claim a monopoly on access to heaven, or to threaten waverers with everlasting fire, let alone to condemn fig trees and persuade devils to infest the bodies of pigs? Such a person if not divine would be a sorcerer and a fanatic."

Criticisms
Writing of the argument's "almost total absence from discussions about the status of Jesus by professional theologians and biblical scholars", Stephen T. Davis comments that it "is often severely criticized, both by people who do and by people who do not believe in the divinity of Jesus".

Jesus' claims to divinity
A frequent criticism is that Lewis's trilemma depends on the veracity of the scriptural accounts of Jesus's statements and miracles. The trilemma rests on the interpretation of New Testament authors' depiction of Jesus: a widespread objection is that the statements by Jesus recorded in the Gospels are being misinterpreted, and do not constitute claims to divinity.
According to Bart Ehrman, it is historically inaccurate that Jesus called himself God, so Lewis's premise of accepting that very claim is problematic. Ehrman stated that it is a mere legend that the historical Jesus has called himself God; that was unknown to Lewis since he never was a professional Bible scholar.

In Honest to God, John A. T. Robinson, then Bishop of Woolwich, criticizes Lewis's approach, questioning the idea that Jesus intended to claim divinity: "It is, indeed, an open question whether Jesus claimed to be Son of God, let alone God". John Hick, writing in 1993, argued that this "once popular form of apologetic" was ruled out by changes in New Testament studies, citing "broad agreement" that scholars do not today support the view that Jesus claimed to be God, quoting as examples Michael Ramsey (1980), C. F. D. Moule (1977), James Dunn (1980), Brian Hebblethwaite (1985) and David Brown (1985). Larry Hurtado, who argues that the followers of Jesus within a very short period developed an exceedingly high level of devotional reverence to Jesus, at the same time says that there is no evidence that Jesus himself demanded or received such cultic reverence. According to Gerd Lüdemann, the broad consensus among modern New Testament scholars is that the proclamation of the divinity of Jesus was a development within the earliest Christian communities.

Unsound logical form
Another criticism raised is that Lewis is creating a false trilemma by insisting that only three options are possible. Craig Evans writes that the "liar, lunatic, Lord" trilemma "makes for good alliteration, maybe even good rhetoric, but it is faulty logic." He proceeds to list several other alternatives: Jesus was Israel's messiah, simply a great prophet, or we do not really know who or what he was because the New Testament sources portray him inaccurately. Philosopher and theologian William Lane Craig also believes that the trilemma is an unsound argument for Christianity. Craig gives several other logically possible alternatives: Jesus' claims as to his divinity were merely good-faith mistakes resulting from his sincere efforts at reasoning, Jesus was deluded with respect to the specific issue of his own divinity while his faculties of moral reasoning remained intact, or Jesus did not understand the claims he made about himself as amounting to a claim to divinity.
Philosopher John Beversluis comments that Lewis "deprives his readers of numerous alternate interpretations of Jesus that carry with them no such odious implications".

Peter Kreeft and Ronald Tacelli, SJ, both professors of philosophy at Boston College, have also expanded the argument into a tetralemma ("Lord, Liar, Lunatic or Legend") — or a pentalemma, accommodating the option that Jesus was a guru, who believed himself to be God in the sense that everything is divine.

Lewis own response to the possibility that the Gospels are Legends 
Justin Taylor points out that Lewis uses his own literary expertise In a 1950 essay, “What Are We to Make of Jesus?” to disagree with the possibility that the Gospels are legends.  Justin Taylor quotes C.S. Lewis: "Now, as a literary historian, I am perfectly convinced that whatever else the Gospels are they are not legends. I have read a great deal of legend and I am quite clear that they are not the same sort of thing. They are not artistic enough to be legends. From an imaginative point of view they are clumsy, they don’t work up to things properly. Most of the life of Jesus is totally unknown to us, as is the life of anyone else who lived at that time, and no people building up a legend would allow that to be so. Apart from bits of the Platonic dialogues, there is no conversation that I know of in ancient literature like the Fourth Gospel. There is nothing, even in modern literature, until about a hundred years ago when the realistic novel came into existence."

See also
 Christological argument
 Christology
 False trilemma
 Mental health of Jesus
 List of Jewish messiah claimants 
 Rejection of Jesus

References

 

C. S. Lewis
Christian apologetics
Religious perspectives on Jesus